Jonathan Philip Hodge (26 January 1941 – 7 July 2019) was a British composer who wrote more than 2,000 jingles for TV and radio, including the Shake n' Vac tune.

Life and career
Hodge was born in London in 1941.

Jonathan wrote the scores for Villain (1971), featuring Richard Burton, and Great (1975), an Oscar-winning animated musical documentary about engineer Isambard Kingdom Brunel directed by Bob Godfrey. He also wrote and produced Fiddley Foodle Bird (1991), a children’s animated series for the BBC narrated by Bruce Forsyth, wrote pop music and had a No.3 hit in 1978 with "If I Had Words sung by Scott Fitzgerald and Yvonne Keeley. The song sold millions worldwide.

He died on 7 July 2019 at the age of 78 at the William Harvey Hospital in Ashford, Kent from multiple organ failure.

References

External links
IMDB page

1941 births
2019 deaths
20th-century British composers
21st-century British composers
Jingle composers
Musicians from London